Folkets Park in Kävlinge, Sweden is a local society who started in 1905 by the workers of Kävlinge shoe factory. In 1905 many people in Kävlinge lived in deep poverty. The factory plant manager allowed workers to explore grounds for growing food besides the factory.

On 28 April 1905 the workers bought land north and west of the factory plant area. Half of it was dedicated to growing food, and the other half to a park for meetings and local pleasures, like dancing and other local festivities. Two days before May Day 1906 the park was officially opened.

Since 2002 the park society has been relocated. A new start with children's theater, local amateur theater and local celebrations has put the park in a new view in Kävlinge. The visitors today come in thousands every year, and many local family traditions have their meetings in the park every summer.

References

 http://www.silverforsen.se/historia.htm Society History of Folkets Park Kävlinge Author:Christer Eklund Date: 2008-11-16 Format:internet Publisher:Andelsföreningen Kävlinge Folkets Park UPA Language:Swedish

External links
 Silverforsen Folkets Park Kävlinge
 Folkets Park on film published on Youtube.Com
 Folkets Park in Google Earth KML-file

Swedish culture